Live Wizardry is an album by Silly Wizard recorded live in concert at Sanders Theatre, Harvard University in Cambridge, Massachusetts in 1983.  Live Wizardry was released by Green Linnet Records in 1988 and contained all but two of the tracks released in 1985 on the live albums Golden Golden and Live in America. The omitted tracks are both instrumental medleys: "Mac's Fancy / The Cliffs Of Moher / "The Rose Of Red Hill / Clootie Dumplings / The Laird O' Drumblair / Sleepy Maggie" from Golden Golden  and "The Green Fields Of Glentown / The Galtee / Bobby Casey's Number Two / A.B. Corsie (The Lad From Orkney)" from Live in America.

Track listing
"Queen of Argyll"
"Mrs. Martha Knowles / The Pitnacree Ferryman /  The New Bob"
"The Parish of Dunkeld / The Curlew"
"The Valley of Strathmore"
"Miss Shepherd / Sweeny's Buttermilk / McGlinchy's Reels"
"The Ramblin' Rover"
"Blackbird"
"Scarce O'Tatties / Lyndhurst"
"The Banks of the Lee"
"Donald McGillavry"
"Golden, Golden"
"The Humours of Tulla / Toss the Feathers / Saint Anne's Reel / Lexy McAskill / The Limerick Lasses / Jean's Reel"
"Broom of the Cowdenknowes"

Personnel
Phil Cunningham -  Accordion, vocals, Mandola, flute
Johnny Cunningham -  Fiddle
Andy M. Stewart -  Banjo, lead vocals
Gordon Jones -  Guitar, vocals, Bodhran
Martin Haddon -  Bass, synthesiser

Release history

References

Silly Wizard albums
1988 live albums